The Berladnici were a supposed medieval people living along the northeastern Black Sea coast. While their ethnicity is unclear, it included runaways from Kievan Rus' who left those lands due to feudal oppression. Peasants as well as boyars dissatisfied with the rulers purportedly settled in the vicinity of the city of Bârlad as well as the river of the same name in eastern Romania, as well as on the lower Don River.

History
The Berladnici are first mentioned in the Ipatiev Chronicle. The text recounts the 1159 war between Prince Yaroslav of Halych and his cousin Ivan Berladnic, during which the latter fled to "the Cumans in towns near the Danube and allied with him many Cumans and Berladnici being over 6,000 people". In 1161, The Berladnici captured the port of Oles at the mouth of the Dnieper river, which caused severe damage to Rus' merchants. They were occupied mainly with fishing, hunting, and crafting. They practiced robbery, often working alongside Cumans in raids against the cities of Rus'. Berladnici nobility consisted of landowners and knyazes refugees who tried to create a state along the lower Danube.

According to Professor Victor Spinei, written sources exclude the existence in the 12th-century of a Romanian territory subordinate to the Principality of Halych. On the other hand Spinei contends that the archaeological evidence from that era does not reveal any typological or quantitative differences between the Bârlad area and the lands in the center and south of Moldova.

There is no mention of the Berladnici after the 13th century. The Ipatiev Chronicle mentions a group of "Galician exiles" led by voivode Yuri Domazhyrych and boyar Volodymyr Derzhykray who come as allies of Kievan Rus' during the Battle of the Kalka River which some interpret to mean the Berladnici.

A small number of historians see in the Berladnici's libertine lifestyle a prototype of the Ukrainian Cossacks who developed in the 15th - 18th centuries.

See also 
 Blakumen
 Bolokhoveni
 Brodnici
 Foundation of Moldavia
 Romania in the Early Middle Ages

References

Sources

Further reading 

The Hypatian Codex II: The Galician-Volynian Chronicle (An annotated translation by George A. Perfecky) (1973). Wilhelm Fink Verlag.

Eastern Romance people
Bolokhovians
Medieval Romania
Medieval Ukraine
12th century in Romania
13th century in Romania
12th century in Ukraine
13th century in Ukraine
13th century in Kievan Rus'